Paul F. O'Brien (born 14 December 1950) is a former Australian rules footballer who played with Carlton in the Victorian Football League (VFL). He later played for Port Melbourne in the Victorian Football Association (VFA).

Notes

External links 

Paul O'Brien's profile at Blueseum

1950 births
Carlton Football Club players
Echuca Football Club players
Australian rules footballers from Victoria (Australia)
Living people
Port Melbourne Football Club players